The 1976 Trans-Am Series was the eleventh running of the Sports Car Club of America's premier series. All races except for the Six Hours of Watkins Glen ran for approximately one hundred miles. American Motors garnered its final Trans Am victories in 1976.

Results

‡ - The 6 Hours of Watkins Glen was a round of the World Championship for Makes. Overall winner was an FIA Group 5 car

References

Trans-Am Series
Trans-Am
Trans-Am